The 13017 / 13018 Ganadevata Express is an important Express-type day-running train operated by Indian Railways; it connects Kolkata with Azimganj, a town in Murshidabad district of West Bengal. It runs daily between Howrah and Azimganj.

The Ganadevata express is used extensively by pilgrims going to visit the Tarapith temple of Rampurhat. It previously ran between Howrah and Rampurhat, and was later extended to run to Azimganj; it covers 278 kilometers distance at an average speed of 47 kmph. Coach types in the train include AC chair car, second class sitting, and general, but it does not have a pantry car. All the classes except general class require reservations. The train leaves Howrah junction at 06:05 to arrive at Azmiganj Junction at 12:00, and leaves Azmiganj at 15:40 to arrive at Howrah at 21:45.

Important stopping points

 Howrah 
 
 Bandel 
 Burdwan 
 .
 Bolpur Shantiniketan railway station
 Prantik railway station
 Ahmedpur
 
 Rampurhat
 Nalhati

Traction
On 1 September 2018, Howrah–Azimganj Ganadevta Express gets the electric traction, after the completion of route electrification up to Azimganj Junction (AZ), ER & it is regularly hauled by a Howrah-based WAP-4 / WAP-5 / WAP-7 electric locomotive from end to end.

Rake sharing
This train shares its rake with 22321/22322 Hool Express.

References

Rail transport in Howrah
Named passenger trains of India
Rail transport in West Bengal
Express trains in India